The Blueskins were a four-piece band who were based in Gawthorpe, near Wakefield, West Yorkshire.

Career
The band was formed after Spendlove and Brown met at music college in 1999. After college they continued to play together and drafted in school friends Smith and Townsend. In 2003 considerable interest in the band resulted in an influx of A&R men to Gawthorpe and a signing to Domino Records. Three singles, an EP and an album  followed, and the band embarked on a tour of Europe and the United States, recording in Mississippi with record producer, Dennis Herring.

In 2005 a change of direction saw Smith and Townsend leave the band and, later that year, the remaining two founder members  brought in the Russian former tennis professional Andrei Nosov on guitar and Welsh student Tom Bailey on five-string bass guitar to replace them. The new members brought with them a range of new influences including native Siberian music and dance-inspired indie.

The band spent much of 2006 writing new material and showcasing it to fans across the country. In the summer their 2003 single "Change My Mind" was featured on a television advertisement for Lynx shower gel. It generated considerable interest in the single, leading it to be re-released. Despite the interest from fans, the band's record label did not push the single and it received limited airplay. Finding themselves unable to market the band, and choosing to concentrate on their more commercial signings, Domino Records parted company with The Blueskins, leaving them on the lookout for a new label.

The band spent the latter months of 2006 touring their new songs and writing new material. At the end of the year they played a small gig in their local pub in Gawthorpe, inviting friends to take to the stage and perform with them. After writing new tunes and touring the UK for two years with the new line-up, they decided to disband in April 2008.

Following the split, Ryan Spendlove, the singer and frontman of The Blueskins decided to go solo and formed his own style of acoustic blues/folk. In January 2011 he signed a record deal with Candyrat Records in the United States where he recorded his first solo album in three days titled "Fable" which was released on 5 April 2011.

Band members
Ryan Spendlove – lead vocals, guitar
Andrei Nosov – guitar, backing vocals
Tom Bailey – bass, backing vocals
Paul Brown – percussion
Matthew Smith - bass
Ritchie Townend - guitar

Discography

Albums
Word of Mouth (2004)

EPs
Magic Road EP (2003)

Singles
"User Friendly" (2003)
"Change My Mind" / "I Wanna Know" (2004) - UK #56
"Stupid Ones" (2004) - UK #61
"Change My Mind" (re-release) (2006)

References

External links
 Official website
 Official Myspace page

English rock music groups